David Roberts is a British property developer, contemporary art collector and founder of the Roberts Institute of Art (formerly DRAF or David Roberts Art Foundation).

Life
David Ian Roberts was brought up in Greenock, Scotland, and his family worked in shipbuilding. He studied for a degree in land economy and then became a commercial property developer. He is the founder and CEO of Edinburgh House Estates. He is married to Lithuanian artist Indrė Šerpytytė.

Art collector

Roberts began collecting in the early 1990s, and the David Roberts Collection (now the David and Indrė Roberts Collection) now consists of more than 2,500 works by over 850 artists. It comprises modern and contemporary works by British and international artists including Ida Applebroog, Charles Avery, John Baldessari, Fiona Banner, Phyllida Barlow, Louise Bourgeois, Martin Boyce, Anthony Caro, Maurizio Cattelan, Patrick Caulfield, Jake & Dinos Chapman, Martin Creed, Enrico David, Tracey Emin, Cerith Wyn Evans, Lucian Freud, Ellen Gallagher, Theaster Gates, Douglas Gordon, Anthony Gormley, Rodney Graham, Andreas Gursky, Philip Harris, Mona Hatoum, Eva Hesse, John Latham, Damien Hirst, Peter Howson, Gary Hume, Bethan Huws, Pierre Huyghe, Anish Kapoor, Anselm Kiefer, Jim Lambie, Sol LeWitt, Roy Lichtenstein, Sarah Lucas, Christian Marclay, Bruce McLean, Joan Miró, Henry Moore, Grayson Perry, Man Ray, Tobias Rehberger, Gerhard Richter, Bridget Riley, Sterling Ruby, Ed Ruscha, Yinka Shonibare, David Shrigley, John Stezaker, Wolfgang Tillmans, Rosemarie Trockel, Oscar Tuazon, Danh Vo, Mark Wallinger, Andy Warhol, Ai Weiwei, Franz West.

DRAF (David Roberts Art Foundation)
In 2007, Roberts founded DRAF (David Roberts Art Foundation), a non-profit contemporary arts organisation. He appointed curator Vincent Honoré to direct a programme of exhibitions, performances and events open free to the public. DRAF originally occupied a gallery space on Great Titchfield Street in Fitzrovia, central London. It moved in 2012 to Camden, north London where it inhabited a large 19th-century former factory, closing the space in 2017 with the aim of sharing DRAF's programme more widely. Between March 2018 - May 2019 Fatoş Üstek was Director and Chief Curator of DRAF, launching a UK-wide collaborative programme. In April 2021 the David Roberts Art Foundation become the Roberts Institute of Art. The Roberts Institute of Art commissions pioneering performance work, collaborates with national partners on exhibitions and works to research and share the David and Indrė Roberts Collection.

References

External links

Living people
British businesspeople
English art collectors
Year of birth missing (living people)